The ICL Series 39 was a range of mainframe and minicomputer computer systems released by the UK manufacturer ICL in 1985. The original Series 39 introduced the "S3L" (whose corrupt pronunciation resulted in the name "Estriel") processors and microcodes, and a nodal architecture, which is a form of Non-Uniform Memory Access .

Origins 
The Series 39 range was based upon the New Range concept and the VME operating system from the company's ICL 2900 line, and was introduced as two ranges:
 Series 39 "Estriel" systems (Series 39 Level 40 and above, including multinodes), which replaced previous mid-range and large processors from the 2900 range, and needed a full computer room environment
 Series 39 DM1 systems (up to Series 39 Level 30), which were intended to replace the smaller processors such as the ICT1901/2, the ICL2903/4 and the ME29 ranges.  These brought mainframe class operating system facilities into the office environment, a first for ICL

Design 

The Series 39 range introduced Nodal Architecture, a novel implementation of distributed shared memory that can be seen as a hybrid of a multiprocessor system and a cluster design. Each machine consists of a number of nodes, and each node contains its own order-code processor and main memory. Virtual machines are typically located (at any one time) on one node, but have the capability to run on any node and to be relocated from one node to another. Discs and other peripherals are shared between nodes. Nodes are connected using a high-speed optical bus (Macrolan) using multiple fibre optic cables, which is used to provide applications with a virtual shared memory. Memory segments that are marked as shared (public or global segments) are replicated to each node, with updates being broadcast over the inter-node network. Processes which use unshared memory segments (nodal or local) run in complete isolation from other nodes and processes.

The semaphore instructions prove their worth by controlling access to the shared writable memory segments while allowing the contents to be moved around efficiently.

Overall, a well configured Series 39 with VME had an architecture which can provide a significant degree of proofing against disasters, a nod to the abortive VME/T ideas of the previous decade.

All Series 39 machines were supported by a set of waist height peripheral 'Cabinets' (connected via fibre optic cables via one or more Multi Port Switch Units or MPSU's) providing disk storage capabilities:-
 Cabinet 2 - these were the main Disk Storage Cabinets holding a pair of 330Mb 8 inch "Swallow" Hard Drives
 Cabinet 3 - these were an expansion cabinet to the Cabinet 2 and could hold up to four more 330Mb 8 inch "Swallow" Hard Drives
 Cabinet 4 - these were a bridge cabinet would was used to connect Series 39 to older 2900 Diskpack based Storage (such as EDS200's)

Cabinet 1 was the name given to the DM1 Series 39 Level 30 (and 20/15/25/35 variants) core system.

All Series 39 machines also featured a Node Support Computer (NSC) hosted on their Storage Motherboards - this was x86 architecture and acted much like today's ILO or DRAC cards on HP/Dell Servers and allowed Support Staff to manage the Nodes remotely including the ability to completely stop and restart the main Nodes.

Evolution 

In the mid-1980s the Series 39 Level 30 was supplemented by a Level 20 variant which was a forcibly underclocked Level 30 (using wire links on a daughterboard).  In the late 80s these were both replaced by Level 15, 25 and 35 variants which also carried various levels of clocking state but featured more memory than their predecessors and could also be fitted with Dual OCP and IOC motherboards for even more computing and I/O capability.

A mid-life upgrade to "S3X" ("Essex") processors and microcodes saw:
 The introduction of SX systems in 1990 to replace the Estriel ("S3L") systems
 The introduction of DX systems in 1993 to replace the DM1 systems

Replacement 

The Series 39 SX/DX was replaced by the Trimetra system (initially the SY/DY, and then the DL/SL ranges), which made more use of industry standard hardware and allowed for both Windows and VME nodes on the same system.

Trimetra in turn was replaced by Fujitsu's mainframe platform, Nova, which emulates the Trimetra architecture on generic Unisys ES7000 Intel-based server hardware.

Nova itself was phased out in 2007 and replaced with SuperNova, which runs OpenVME on top of Windows Server or Linux, using as few as two CPUs on generic Wintel server hardware.

The transition of the "ICL mainframe" to a pure software product was thus complete, enabling Fujitsu to concentrate on VME support and development without having to keep up with hardware technology.

Notes

References 
 SERIES 39 - An Introduction to VME. Marion and Richard Norris. ICL 1991 R30303/02.
 Datasheet Trimetra NOVA 5 Fujitsu 2006.
 Introduction to superNOVA architecture Fujitsu 2005
 R. Whetton, M. Jones and D. Murray, "The use of Ward and Mellor Structured Methodology for the design of a complex real time system," IEE Colloquium on Computer Aided Software Engineering Tools for Real-Time Control, 1991, pp. 5/1-5/4.

Computing platforms
39
32-bit computers
Computer-related introductions in 1985